is a Japanese pop singer, dancer, actress and former model. She is a ninth generation member of J-pop group Morning Musume. She joined Morning Musume in 2011 along with Riho Sayashi, Kanon Suzuki and Mizuki Fukumura. On 26 November 2014, she became Sub-Leader of Morning Musume along with member Haruna Ikubo and later on with Ayumi Ishida.

Biography

History
Before Ikuta joined Hello! Project, she was a fashion model with Elegant Promotion, and had a blog where she posted photos of what she was doing and outfits she wore. Ikuta was selected from Morning Musume's ninth generation "Kyūki Audition" to join the group on 2 January 2011, with Riho Sayashi, Kanon Suzuki, and Mizuki Fukumura. The new generation was officially revealed at the Hello! Project 2011 Winter: Kangei Shinsen Matsuri concert. She made her official debut on Morning Musume's 45th single "Maji Desu ka Ska!", released 6 April 2011.

In August 2011, she replaced the graduated Saki Ogawa of S/mileage on the children's morning program Oha Suta as an Oha Girl. On 27 March 2012, she and Oha Girl Maple have graduated from the show. On 18 April 2012, it was announced that Reina Tanaka and Morning Musume's 9th & 10th Generation members would star in a new stage play titled Stacey’s Shoujo Saisatsu Kageki, scheduled to run from 6–12 June 2012.

Hello! Project groups and units
 Morning Musume (2011–present)
 Hello! Project Mobekimasu (2011–2012)
 Harvest (2012–present)
 Hello! Project MobekisuJ (2013–present)
 HI-FIN (2013–present)

Discography
for Erina Ikuta's releases with Morning Musume, see Morning Musume discography.

Filmography

DVDs

 Photobooks
[2016.10.22] Erina (衣梨奈)
[2018.01.20] if

 Films
 2011: Sharehouse (シェアハウス)

 Dramas
 2012: Suugaku♥Joshi Gakuen (数学♥女子学園)
 2017: Konnichiwa, Joyuu no Sagara Itsuki Desu. (こんにちは、女優の相楽樹です。)

 TV Programs
 2011: Bijo Gaku (美女学)
 2011: Hello Pro! Time (ハロプロ！Time)
 2011–2012: Oha Suta (as an Oha Girl in the unit Oha Girl Maple)
 2012–2013: Hello! SATOYAMA Life (ハロー! SATOYAMA ライフ)
 2014- : The Girls Live
 2015: Karada wo Ugokasu TV (体を動かすTV)
 2018– : Ikuta Erina no VS Golf (生田衣梨奈のVSゴルフ)

Internet
 2011: UstreaMusume
 2011: Michishige Sayumi no "Mobekimasutte Nani??" (道重さゆみの『モベキマスってなに？？』)
 2011: IkuMatsuri (生祭り) (special one-day Ustream)
 2012–2013: Morning Musume 9ki・10ki Member WEB Talk Maji DE Pyoko! (モーニング娘。9・10期メンバー WEBトーク 本気DE飛跳！) (fanclub exclusive)
 2013– : Hello! Project Station (ハロ！ステ)
 2016– : Upcoming

Theater
 17 August 2011: Reborn: Inochi no Audition (リボーン～命のオーディション～)
 12 June 2012: Stacy's Shoujo Saisatsu Kageki (ステーシーズ 少女再殺歌劇)
 18 June 2015: TRIANGLE (TRIANGLE -トライアングル-) (VTR role)
 11 June 2016: Zoku 11nin Iru! Higashi no Chihei, Nishi no Towa (続・11人いる！東の地平・西の永遠)
 2 June 2017: Pharaoh no Haka (ファラオの墓)
 1 June 2018: Pharaoh no Haka ~Hebi Ou Sneferu~ (ファラオの墓～蛇王・スネフェル～)

References

External links
 Official profile at helloproject.com 
  
  
 UstreaMusume Channel

|-

Morning Musume members
1997 births
Living people
People from Fukuoka
21st-century Japanese actresses
Japanese female idols
Japanese women pop singers
Musicians from Fukuoka Prefecture